The 1949 Virginia Cavaliers football team represented the University of Virginia during the 1949 college football season. The Cavaliers were led by fourth-year head coach Art Guepe and played their home games at Scott Stadium in Charlottesville, Virginia. They competed as independents. Opening the year with seven straight victories, Virginia climbed to ninth in the AP Poll. They lost their final two games of the year, including to rival North Carolina, to finish 7–2.

Schedule

References

Virginia
Virginia Cavaliers football seasons
Virginia Cavaliers football